Luigi Serafini (17 June 1951 – 23 August 2020) was an Italian basketball player. He was part of the Italian teams that won a bronze medal at the 1971 European championships and finished fourth in 1977. He competed at the 1972 and 1976 Olympics and finished in fourth and fifth place, respectively.

References

1951 births
2020 deaths
Italian men's basketball players
Olympic basketball players of Italy
Basketball players at the 1972 Summer Olympics
Basketball players at the 1976 Summer Olympics
Pallacanestro Milano 1958 players
Sportspeople from the Province of Modena